The ilvH RNA motif is a conserved RNA structure that was discovered by bioinformatics.
ilvH motifs are found in Betaproteobacteria.

ilvH motif RNAs likely function as cis-regulatory elements, in view of their positions upstream of protein-coding genes.  Specifically, the RNAs are upstream of genes that encode a predicted acetolactate synthase, which is involved in the synthesis of branched-chain amino acids.

References

Non-coding RNA